Meghaul Pethiya is a Haat-Bazaar in Begusarai district, Indian state of Bihar. The Village has a twice weekly market and hosts three temples.

References

Villages in Begusarai district